Gito may refer to:
 Gito, Iran, a village in Hamadan Province, Iran
 Gito, l'ingrat, a 1992 Burundian comedy film directed by Léonce Ngabo
 Gito Baloi (1964–2004), a Mozambiquan musician